Spooky Nights is a Philippine television comedy horror anthology broadcast by GMA Network. It premiered on March 26, 2011. It was replaced by Spooky Valentine in February 2012. On March 10, 2012, Spooky Nights returned. The show concluded on April 28, 2012.

The series is streaming online on YouTube.

Episodes

"Bampirella"

"The Ringtone"

"Snow White Lady and the Seven Ghosts"

"Nuno sa Feng Shui"

"Ang Manananggala: Battle of the Half-Sisters"

"Bahay ni Lolo: A Very Spooky Night"

"Da Mami"

"The Mommy Returns"

"Ang Munting Mahadera"

"Short Time of My Life"

"Sapi"

"Sumpa (The Chain Text Message)"

"Singil"

"Sanggol"

"Siyam"

"Kadugo"

"KaLAbit"

"Kalaro"

"Kaibigan"

"Panata"

"Parol"

"Perya"

"Orasyon"

"Aparisyon"

"Kalansay"

"Kasambahay"

"Korona"

Ratings
According to AGB Nielsen Philippines' Mega Manila household television ratings, the pilot episode of Spooky Nights earned a 20.7% rating. While the final episode scored a 17.4% rating.

Accolades

References

2011 Philippine television series debuts
2012 Philippine television series endings
Filipino-language television shows
GMA Network original programming
Philippine anthology television series